The Prague Open (currently branded as the Livesport Prague Open for sponsorship reasons) is a professional women's tennis tournament held in Prague, Czech Republic. It began in 2010, initially as an ITF Circuit $50,000 event upgraded to $100,000. Subsequently, from 2015 onwards it became a WTA International tournament and the prize money increased to $250,000.

The tournament is played on outdoor hard courts, at the TK Sparta Praha. Prior to 2021, the tournament was held on outdoor clay courts.

Lucie Šafářová and Lucie Hradecká are respectively the singles and doubles record holders of the tournament with three titles each one.

Past finals

Singles

Doubles

See also
I.ČLTK Prague Open
Sparta Prague Open Challenger

References

External links
 Archived official website (2010-2014) 
 Archived official website (2015-2019) 
 Official website

 
Tennis tournaments in the Czech Republic
Clay court tennis tournaments
Hard court tennis tournaments
Indoor tennis tournaments
ITF Women's World Tennis Tour
WTA Tour
Recurring sporting events established in 2010